Code page 904 (CCSID 904) is encoded for use as the single byte component of certain traditional Chinese character encodings. It is used in Taiwan. When combined with the double-byte Code page 927, it forms the two code-sets of Code page 938.

Codepage layout

References

904